Derbyshire County Cricket Club in 1961 represents cricket season when the English club Derbyshire had been playing for ninety years. It was their fifty-seventh season in the County Championship and they won ten matches to finish seventh in the County Championship.

1961 season

Derbyshire played 28 games in the County Championship, and one match against Oxford University, one against the touring Australians and an extra match against Nottinghamshire. They won ten matches altogether Donald Carr was in his seventh season as captain. Laurie Johnson was top scorer and Harold Rhodes took most wickets with 101.

The only new member of the team was Bob Taylor, a future captain and international, who had played in the second XI in the previous year. He was brought in to keep wicket after George Dawkes suffered from knee problems.

Matches

{| class="wikitable" width="100%"
! bgcolor="#efefef" colspan=6 | List of matches
|- bgcolor="#efefef"
!No.
!Date
!V
!Result 
!Margin
!Notes
 |- 
|1
|26 Apr 1961 
| Nottinghamshire  Trent Bridge, Nottingham 
|bgcolor="#FFCC00"|Drawn
|
|    Not a county championship match 
|- 
|2
|3 May 1961 
|Australians  Queen's Park, Chesterfield 
|bgcolor="#FFCC00"|Drawn
|
|    Only 22 overs played 
|- 
|3
|10 May 1961 
| Kent County Ground, Derby 
|bgcolor="#FFCC00"|Drawn
|
|   Sayer 5–48; HJ Rhodes 5–59  
|- 
|4
|13 May 1961 
| Nottinghamshire  Trent Bridge, Nottingham 
|bgcolor="#00FF00"|Won 
|3 wickets
|    Winfield 109; DB Carr 143 
|- 
|5
|17 May 1961 
| Somerset Recreation Ground, Bath 
|bgcolor="#00FF00"|Won 
|3 wickets
|    Wright 102; DC Morgan 5–40 
|- 
|6
|20 May 1961 
| Northamptonshire  County Ground, Northampton 
|bgcolor="#FF0000"|Lost 
|129 runs
|    Allen 8–48 and 5–50; HJ Rhodes 5–48; E Smith 5–41 
|- 
|7
|24 May 1961 
|  Worcestershire County Ground, Derby 
|bgcolor="#FF0000"|Lost 
|Innings and 15 runs
|    Coldwell 5–44; Gifford 5–17 
|- 
|8
|27 May 1961 
| Glamorgan   Queen's Park, Chesterfield 
|bgcolor="#FF0000"|Lost 
|14 runs
|    IR Buxton 6–80 
|- 
|9
|3 Jun 1961 
| Lancashire  Old Trafford, Manchester 
|bgcolor="#FF0000"|Lost 
|109 runs
|    Grieves 139 
|- 
|10
|7 Jun 1961  
|  Sussex   County Ground, Derby 
|bgcolor="#FFCC00"|Drawn
|
|    IR Buxton 5–52; Thomson 5–54 and 6–46 
|- 
|11
|10 Jun 1961 
| Essex   Hoffman's Sports and Social Club Ground, Chelmsford 
|bgcolor="#FFCC00"|Drawn
|
|    G Smith 148; HL Johnson 119; TJP Eyre 5–75  
|- 
|12
|17 Jun 1961 
| Essex   Ind Coope Ground, Burton-on-Trent 
|bgcolor="#FF0000"|Lost 
|181 runs
|    Knight 120; HL Jackson 5–30; Bailey 5–27 
|- 
|13
|21 Jun 1961 
| Lancashire  Queen's Park, Chesterfield 
|bgcolor="#00FF00"|Won 
|Innings and 141 runs
|    HL Jackson 6–15; TJP Eyre 5–40 
|- 
|14
|24 Jun 1961 
|Oxford University    Park Road Ground, Buxton 
|bgcolor="#FFCC00"|Drawn
|
|    HJ Rhodes took a hattrick to finish Oxford's second innings 
|- 
|15
|28 Jun 1961 
| Yorkshire Bramall Lane, Sheffield 
|bgcolor="#FFCC00"|Drawn
|
|    Trueman 6–60 and 5–63 
|- 
|16
|1 Jul 1961 
| Leicestershire County Ground, Derby 
|bgcolor="#00FF00"|Won 
|9 wickets
|    HL Jackson 5–53; Spencer 5–32 
|- 
|17
|5 Jul 1961 
|  Gloucestershire  Wagon Works Ground, Gloucester 
|bgcolor="#FFCC00"|Drawn
|
|    HL Johnson 122; A'Court 6–50; Cook 5–41 
|- 
|18
|8 Jul 1961 
| Yorkshire Queen's Park, Chesterfield 
|bgcolor="#FF0000"|Lost 
|Innings and 18 runs
|    Stott 114 
|- 
|19
|12 Jul 1961 
| Glamorgan   Cardiff Arms Park 
|bgcolor="#FFCC00"|Drawn
|
|    HJ Rhodes 5–80; Shepherd5-96 
|- 
|20
|19 Jul 1961 
| Warwickshire  County Ground, Derby 
|bgcolor="#00FF00"|Won 
|3 wickets
|    IR Buxton 5–41 and 5–63; Thompson 5–46 and 5–75
|- 
|21
|22 Jul 1961 
|  Worcestershire Chester Road North Ground, Kidderminster 
|bgcolor="#FF0000"|Lost 
|185 runs
|    Headley 103; Coldwell 8–41  
|- 
|22
|26 Jul 1961 
|Middlesex    Lord's Cricket Ground, St John's Wood 
|bgcolor="#00FF00"|Won 
|7 wickets
|    Parfitt 113; HJ Rhodes 7–74 
|- 
|23
|29 Jul 1961 
| Nottinghamshire  Rutland Recreation Ground, Ilkeston 
|bgcolor="#FFCC00"|Drawn
|
|    DB Carr 130  
|- 
|24
|2 Aug 1961 
| Somerset Queen's Park, Chesterfield 
|bgcolor="#00FF00"|Won 
|6 wickets
|    HL Jackson 5–33; Palmer 6–76 
|- 
|25
|5 Aug 1961  
| Northamptonshire  County Ground, Derby 
|bgcolor="#FFCC00"|Drawn
|
|     
|- 
|26
|9 Aug 1961 
| Leicestershire Grace Road, Leicester 
|bgcolor="#00FF00"|Won 
|136 runs
|    HL Johnson 116; Savage 5–81; HJ Rhodes 5–49 
|- 
|27
|12 Aug 1961 
| Hampshire County Ground, Derby 
|bgcolor="#FF0000"|Lost 
|58 runs
|    Horton 141; Shackleton 6–90 
|- 
|28
|19 Aug 1961 
|  Surrey Queen's Park, Chesterfield 
|bgcolor="#00FF00"|Won 
|4 wickets
|    HL Jackson 6–40 and 5–68; Sydenham 5–102 
|- 
|29
|23 Aug 1961 
| Warwickshire Edgbaston, Birmingham 
|bgcolor="#FFCC00"|Drawn
|
|    Stewart 135; Wright 5–68; Bannister 6–30 
|- 
|30
|26 Aug 1961 
|  Sussex   Manor Sports Ground, Worthing 
|bgcolor="#00FF00"|Won 
|65 runs
|    WF Oates 148; E Smith 5–76 
|- 
|31
|30 Aug 1961 
| Hampshire Dean Park, Bournemouth 
|bgcolor="#FF0000"|Lost 
|140 runs
|    HL Johnson 112; Wassell 5–132; Shackleton 6–39 
|- 
|

Statistics

County Championship batting averages

County Championship bowling averages

Wicket Keepers
GO Dawkes 	Catches 33, Stumping 1 (not in championship) 
Bob Taylor Catches 47, Stumping 6

See also
Derbyshire County Cricket Club seasons
1961 English cricket season

References

1961 in English cricket
Derbyshire County Cricket Club seasons